Devendra Pratap Singh (1965/1966) is an Indian politician and member of the Bharatiya Janata Party. Singh is a member of the Uttar Pradesh Legislative Council from the Gorakhpur Faizabaad graduate Constituency. Previously, he was a member of the Samajwadi Party. He was elected for a fourth time. He was also the leader of opposition in the house of legislative council.

References 

People from Kanpur
Samajwadi Party politicians
Bharatiya Janata Party politicians from Uttar Pradesh
Members of the Uttar Pradesh Legislative Council
21st-century Indian politicians
Year of birth missing
1960s births